The cuneiform an sign (or sumerogram AN, in Akkadian consisting of ASH 𒀸 and MAŠ 𒈦), is a common, multi-use sign, a syllabic for an, and an alphabetic sign used for a, or n; it is common in both the Epic of Gilgamesh over hundreds of years, and the 1350 BC Amarna letters, and other cuneiform texts. It is also used for the designation of a "god", and is sometimes represented as a superscript: d, or capitalized: D, for "dingir", English language, "god". The example photo at right shows (2nd list), a list of 14 named gods, all with "an"; the first pair on the list AN-UTU, or DUTU, refers to the "sun-god", using Ud (cuneiform), as the sumerogram, namely UTU (sun Sumerogram).

Cuneiform an can also be found in compound form with another cuneiform sign, an example being DAGAL, . The older version of DAGAL used the 'god symbol' as a star within the sign: ; (older version of DAGAL,).

Epic of Gilgamesh usage
In the Epic of Gilgamesh, Tablets I-XII, "an" is used for the following meanings by the following numbers: an-(120) times, ìl-(0) times, d-(593), AN-(27), and DINGIR-(76) times.

List of Babylonian gods, etc.
From Budge's revised book on Babylonian Life and History, a list of many of the major gods from Babylonian history (and Sumerian):

Anu, or Anum
Bêl (An Be), 
 or Enlil (An En lil), -?
Ea (An É a), 
The "Moon-God":
Sin (An-Sin), An

Enzu (An En-zu) 

Nannaru (An LUGAL Ki)
Shamash (An UTU)
The "Wind-God": (see Photo-caption, above)
Adad
Rammânu
The "Great God-of-Babylon":
Marduk or 
Bêl-Marduk
Nabû (Nebo) (An ?, or An "pa"), -?, or 

Ninurta (Enurta)
Nergal
Gibil
Nusku (An Nus?-ku), 
Irra
Ashshur
Tiamat
Apsu (Abzu)
Lakhmu
Lakhamu
Anshar
Kishar
Mummu (An Mu-um-mu), ---
Kingu
Ishtar
Ninlil (An Nin Lil)
Damkina (An Dam Ki na), -Dam-

List of gods and associated temples, towns, etc.

Anu, or Anum, the E-anna in Uruk
Bêl (An Be)
 or Enlil (An En lil), E-kur in Nippur
Ea (An É a), E-apsu in Eridu; Ibex
The "Moon-God":
Sin (An-Sin), E-gishshirgal in Ur, E-khulkhul in Harran
Enzu (An En-zu)
Nannaru (An LUGAL Ki)

Shamash (An UTU)
The "Wind-God":
Adad
Rammânu
The "Great God-of-Babylon":
Marduk (E-sagila in Babylon, w/"serpent-gryphon", No. "Ten", Jupiter), or, 
Bêl-Marduk
Nabû (Nebo) (An ?, or An "pa"), Shrines at Borsippa, and Calah-(Nimrud)

References

Budge. Babylonian Life and History, Budge, E.A. Wallace (Barnes & Noble edition), c 2005 (c 1883, revised 1925), 245 pages. (softcover)
Moran, William L. 1987, 1992. The Amarna Letters. Johns Hopkins University Press, 1987, 1992. 393 pages.(softcover)
 Parpola, 1971. The Standard Babylonian Epic of Gilgamesh, Parpola, Simo, Neo-Assyrian Text Corpus Project, c 1997, Tablet I thru Tablet XII, Index of Names, Sign List, and Glossary-(pp. 119–145), 165 pages.(softcover)-(Volume 1)

Cuneiform signs